Western Port Province was an electorate of the Victorian Legislative Council. It was created in 2002 as a replacement for the abolished South Eastern Province. It was intended to be a two-member electorate, but it was abolished in 2006 as part of the Bracks Labor government's reform of the Legislative Council, before the second member was due to be elected. The electorate would have normally been expected to be reasonably safe for the Liberal Party, but it was narrowly won by the Labor Party in their landslide victory at the 2002 state election.

It was located in the south-east of the state. In 2002, when it was last contested, it covered an area of 2,866 km2 and included the towns of Cowes, Hastings, Inverloch, Mornington, Mount Eliza, Pakenham, Rosebud, Rye, Sorrento and Wonthaggi.

Members for Western Port Province

Election results

References

Former electoral provinces of Victoria (Australia)
2002 establishments in Australia
2006 disestablishments in Australia